W1A is a British mockumentary sitcom television series that satirises the management of the BBC. It was created by John Morton, and first broadcast on BBC Two on 19 March 2014. The series is the follow-up to Twenty Twelve, a BAFTA-winning comedy series by the BBC about the 2012 Summer Olympics in London. It sees the reintroduction of Hugh Bonneville and Jessica Hynes as their Twenty Twelve characters, alongside a new cast, with David Tennant's role as narrator also continuing from the earlier series.

The first series began on 19 March 2014, concluding on 9 April. A second series was announced later in 2014 which launched on 23 April 2015 with a one-hour special. In August 2016, Radio Times announced that W1A had been recommissioned for a third and final series, which began airing on 18 September 2017.

The series is named after the postal code of the BBC's headquarters, Broadcasting House, which is W1A 1AA.

Plot
The series revolves around Ian Fletcher (Hugh Bonneville), formerly the Head of the Olympic Deliverance Commission, who has been chosen to be the Head of Values at the BBC. His task is to clarify, define, or re-define the core purpose of the BBC across all its functions and to position it confidently for the future. The series deals with the everyday events at the corporation, and how the team deal with these. Such events include the arrival of King Charles, problems surrounding a new programme entitled Britain's Tastiest Village, as well as media scrutiny of Ian Fletcher's salary, the decision to cut the BBC Big Swing Band (which turns out to be beloved by all) and a cross-dressing ex-Premier League football player who wants to be a television pundit but is terrible at it.

Cast

Bonneville reprises his role of Ian Fletcher from W1A's predecessor, Twenty Twelve, as does Hynes, who plays Siobhan Sharpe, the Head of Perfect Curve, a brand consultant agency. Also returning are Sharpe's team, consisting of Barney Lumsden, Coco Lomax and Karl Marx (Beckett, Pascoe and Fry, respectively), whilst the remainder of the cast were created by Morton as new characters.

Cameo/guest appearances

Alan Yentob (2014, 2015; 2 episodes)
Carol Vorderman (2014; 2 episodes)
Salman Rushdie (2014; 1 episode)
Olivia Colman (2014; 1 episode)
Matt Addis (2014; 1 episode)
Jenni Murray (2014; 1 episode)
Clare Balding (2014; 1 episode)
Evan Davis (2015; 2 episodes)
Samuel West (2015; 1 episode)
Alex Jones (2015; 1 episode)
Matt Baker (2015; 1 episode)
Sarah Hadland (2015; 1 episode)
Sophie Raworth (2015; 1 episode)
Mary Beard (2015; 1 episode)
Jeremy Paxman (2017; 1 episode)
Gary Lineker (2017; 1 episode)
Alan Shearer (2017; 1 episode)
Lenny Henry (2017; 1 episode)
Hugh Grant (2017; 1 episode)
Rose Matafeo (2017; 1 episode)
Claudia Winkleman (2017; 1 episode)
Tony Hall (2017; 1 episode)

Production
W1A was commissioned by Janice Hadlow, controller of BBC Two, and Shane Allen, controller of comedy commissioning. Filming began in January 2014. W1A was written and directed by John Morton, who previously worked on Twenty Twelve and People Like Us. The producer is Paul Schlesinger and the executive producer is Jon Plowman. A second series was commissioned in September 2014, with Bonneville's return also confirmed.

Episodes

Series overview

Series 1

Series 2
On 15 September 2014, it was announced that W1A would return for a second series in 2015. This began with a 60-minute special on 23 April, followed by three 30-minute episodes.

Series 3
In August 2016, the BBC announced that W1A would return for a third and final series, due to be produced and broadcast in 2017. Some filming with Jeremy Paxman took place in March.

Series 3 began on 18 September 2017 on BBC Two.

After the transmission of Episode 1 on BBC Two Episode 2 was made available on BBC iPlayer on 18 September 2017. Likewise after the transmission of Episode 3 on 2 October 2017 Episode 4 was made available online. This was repeated for episodes 5 and 6.

Webisodes
In 2020, during the COVID-19 pandemic and lockdown, a number of specially created webisodes featuring the characters from W1A were produced. The first was released on 19 May, when Hugh Bonneville, in character as Ian Fletcher, introduced the BBC Concert Orchestra performing a new arrangement of Las Vegas, the series' theme tune. On 21 May, a second video was released, this time featuring Bonneville, Sarah Parrish, Jason Watkins, Monica Dolan and David Westhead at the first virtual meeting of the BBC's 'COVID-19 Bounce Back Group'.

Awards and nominations

References

External links
 
 
 
 
2014 British television series debuts
2017 British television series endings
2010s British comedy television series
Television shows set in the United Kingdom
British mockumentary television series
BBC television comedy
English-language television shows